The meridian 132° east of Greenwich is a line of longitude that extends from the North Pole across the Arctic Ocean, Asia, Australia, the Indian Ocean, the Southern Ocean, and Antarctica to the South Pole.

The 132nd meridian east forms a great circle with the 48th meridian west.

From Pole to Pole
Starting at the North Pole and heading south to the South Pole, the 132nd meridian east passes through:

{| class="wikitable plainrowheaders"
! scope="col" width="130" | Co-ordinates
! scope="col" | Country, territory or sea
! scope="col" | Notes
|-
| style="background:#b0e0e6;" | 
! scope="row" style="background:#b0e0e6;" | Arctic Ocean
| style="background:#b0e0e6;" |
|-
| style="background:#b0e0e6;" | 
! scope="row" style="background:#b0e0e6;" | Laptev Sea
| style="background:#b0e0e6;" |
|-valign="top"
| 
! scope="row" | 
| Sakha Republic Khabarovsk Krai — from  Sakha Republic — from  Khabarovsk Krai — from  Amur Oblast — from  Khabarovsk Krai — from  Amur Oblast — from  Khabarovsk Krai — from  Jewish Autonomous Oblast — from 
|-valign="top"
| 
! scope="row" | 
| Heilongjiang
|-valign="top"
| 
! scope="row" | 
| Primorsky Krai — Passing just east of Vladivostok (at )
|-
| style="background:#b0e0e6;" | 
! scope="row" style="background:#b0e0e6;" | Sea of Japan
| style="background:#b0e0e6;" | Passing just east of the Liancourt Rocks (at )
|-valign="top"
| 
! scope="row" | 
| Island of Honshū— Shimane Prefecture— Yamaguchi Prefecture — from 
|-
| style="background:#b0e0e6;" | 
! scope="row" style="background:#b0e0e6;" | Inland Sea
| style="background:#b0e0e6;" |
|-
| style="background:#b0e0e6;" | 
! scope="row" style="background:#b0e0e6;" | Bungo Channel
| style="background:#b0e0e6;" |
|-
| 
! scope="row" | 
| Island of Kyūshū, Ōita Prefecture
|-valign="top"
| style="background:#b0e0e6;" | 
! scope="row" style="background:#b0e0e6;" | Pacific Ocean
| style="background:#b0e0e6;" | Passing just east of the island of Pulo Anna,  (at  )
|-
| 
! scope="row" | 
| Island of New Guinea
|-
| style="background:#b0e0e6;" | 
! scope="row" style="background:#b0e0e6;" | Berau Bay
| style="background:#b0e0e6;" |
|-
| 
! scope="row" | 
| Island of New Guinea
|-
| style="background:#b0e0e6;" | 
! scope="row" style="background:#b0e0e6;" | Ceram Sea
| style="background:#b0e0e6;" |
|-
| 
! scope="row" | 
| Island of Kur
|-
| style="background:#b0e0e6;" | 
! scope="row" style="background:#b0e0e6;" | Banda Sea
| style="background:#b0e0e6;" |
|-
| 
! scope="row" | 
| Island of Fordata
|-valign="top"
| style="background:#b0e0e6;" | 
! scope="row" style="background:#b0e0e6;" | Arafura Sea
| style="background:#b0e0e6;" | Passing just east of the island of Larat,  (at )
|-
| 
! scope="row" | 
| Northern Territory — Cobourg Peninsula
|-
| style="background:#b0e0e6;" | 
! scope="row" style="background:#b0e0e6;" | Van Diemen Gulf
| style="background:#b0e0e6;" |
|-valign="top"
| 
! scope="row" | 
| Northern Territory South Australia — from 
|-
| style="background:#b0e0e6;" | 
! scope="row" style="background:#b0e0e6;" | Indian Ocean
| style="background:#b0e0e6;" | Australian authorities consider this to be part of the Southern Ocean
|-
| style="background:#b0e0e6;" | 
! scope="row" style="background:#b0e0e6;" | Southern Ocean
| style="background:#b0e0e6;" |
|-
| 
! scope="row" | Antarctica
| Australian Antarctic Territory, claimed by 
|-
|}

See also
131st meridian east
133rd meridian east

References

e132 meridian east